Crocus serotinus, the late crocus, is a species of flowering plant in the genus Crocus of the family Iridaceae, found in the Iberian peninsula and North Africa.

References

serotinus
Plants described in 1868